Clotilde Mollet is a French actress.

Theatre

Filmography

References

External links

French film actresses
20th-century French actresses
21st-century French actresses
Actresses from Paris
Living people
French stage actresses
French television actresses
Year of birth missing (living people)